Whitford is a hamlet in central Alberta, Canada within Lamont County. The first school was built in 1895 with John and Andrew Whitford as trustees.

Demographics 
Whitford recorded a population of 6 in the 1981 Census of Population conducted by Statistics Canada.

See also 
List of communities in Alberta
List of hamlets in Alberta

References 

Hamlets in Alberta
Lamont County